Ostedes is a genus of beetles in the family Cerambycidae, containing the following species:

subgenus Dentatostedes
 Ostedes bidentata (Pic, 1933)

subgenus Ostedes
 Ostedes albomarmorata Breuning, 1969
 Ostedes albosparsa (Pic, 1926)
 Ostedes andamanica Breuning, 1958
 Ostedes binodosa Gressitt, 1945
 Ostedes borneana Breuning, 1964
 Ostedes brunneovariegata Breuning, 1961
 Ostedes coomani Pic, 1927
 Ostedes dentata Pic, 1936
 Ostedes discovitticollis Breuning, 1956
 Ostedes enganensis Breuning, 1982
 Ostedes griseoapicaloides Breuning, 1977
 Ostedes harmandi Breuning, 1968
 Ostedes inermis Schwarzer, 1925
 Ostedes kadleci Danilevsky, 1992
 Ostedes laterifusca Breuning, 1969
 Ostedes macrophthalma Breuning, 1977
 Ostedes ochreosparsa Breuning, 1964
 Ostedes pauperata Pascoe, 1859
 Ostedes perakensis Breuning, 1969
 Ostedes rufipennis Pic, 1944
 Ostedes sikkimensis Breuning, 1958
 Ostedes subfasciata Matsushita, 1933
 Ostedes subochreosparsa Breuning, 1965
 Ostedes subrufipennis Breuning, 1963
 Ostedes sumatrana Pic, 1944
 Ostedes tonkinea Pic, 1944
 Ostedes tuberculata (Pic, 1925)
 Ostedes variegata Aurivillius, 1913

subgenus Trichostedes
 Ostedes assamana Breuning, 1961
 Ostedes laosensis Breuning, 1963
 Ostedes ochreomarmorata Breuning, 1963
 Ostedes ochreopicta Breuning, 1965
 Ostedes spinipennis Breuning, 1964

References

 
Acanthocinini